Sacrifice is a 2016 American thriller film that was written and directed by Peter A. Dowling, and starred Radha Mitchell and Rupert Graves. It was filmed in Ireland, in Shetland in the United Kingdom, and New York City. The film is based on the book Sacrifice by Sharon Bolton.

Plot
Tora Hamilton (Radha Mitchell) is an obstetrician who moves together with her husband, Duncan (Rupert Graves), to the remote Shetland Islands, 100 miles off the northeast coast of Scotland. Deep within the soil around her new house, Tora finds the body of a girl with runes carved into her skin and a gaping hole in her chest where her heart once was. Ignoring warnings to leave the body alone, Tora uncovers frightening connections to an ancient legend.

Cast
 Radha Mitchell as Dr. Tora Hamilton 
 Rupert Graves as Duncan Guthrie 
 Ian McElhinney as D.I. McKie
 David Robb as Richard Guthrie
 Liam Carney as Mr. Grey
 Joanne Crawford as Sgt. Dana Tulloch
 Peter Vollebregt as Kenn Wickliff
 Conor Mullen as Dr. Stephen Renney
Lewis Tan as Ben Kittman

Reviews
According to Neurotic Monkey of Tiny Mix Tapes, "Sacrifice isn’t a bad film, it’s just not a good one. It lacks the twists and turns needed to really sell the ideas at play, which is a shame as there is certainly a good idea for a movie in there. Perhaps if it had been shot with more flair, or had something else to highlight besides the plodding plot, it could be redeemed."

References

External links
 

Films set in Scotland
Films set on islands
2010s English-language films